The Indian Racing League (formerly known as the X1 Racing League) is an auto racing championship based in India.

It is unrelated to the proposed i1 Super Series that was based on a similar idea.

History
It is co-founded by Indian professional drivers, Aditya Patel and Armaan Ebrahim. The X1Racing follows the X1Racing eSports Racing season 1, a digital-simulator based racing competition which was held in Mumbai, Chennai, Pune, Hyderabad, Ahmedabad and Delhi.

For the first season in 2019, the series operated decade-old Formula BMW machinery having originally planned to run Radicals. Just two events were held having scheduled four, and track-time at the second and final round was condensed due to travel constraints. A number of the cars suffered from mechanical problems, halving the field from 12 cars to 6 at the second and final event. The Bangalore Racing Stars team were crowned champions.

After delays due to the coronavirus pandemic, the championship returned in late-2022 having been re-named the Indian Racing League. The series was scheduled to be held alongside the Formula Regional Indian Championship before moving to a standalone schedule, whilst organisers imported a fleet of Wolf GB08s to avoid the technical issues that beset the first season. Despite this, all of the races at the first event in Hyderabad were cancelled after Vishnu Prasad broke his leg in a practice crash.

Format
Teams are franchise-based and represent major Indian cities. Each team has two cars and four drivers – two drivers must be Indian, one a professional from outside of India and one female driver. Two drivers are assigned to each car, one Indian driver and one international/female driver.

In 2019, each event consisted of three 30mins + 1 lap races. The races were relays, with a mandatory pit-stop for a driver change in each.

In 2022, three races will again be held per round – but the first two of these will be 25min + 1 lap "sprint races" and the third is a 45min + 1 lap "feature race". As there are two drivers per car, for Race 1 Driver A will qualify and Driver B will start, for Race 2 Driver B will qualify and Driver A will start, and the feature race will see the grid determined by aggregate event points with both drivers competing by way of a mandatory driver change.

Champions

References

Motorsport competitions in India